Magnolia is a census-designated place and unincorporated community in LaRue County, Kentucky, United States. Its population was 524 as of the 2010 census.
The Magnolia area was settled in the 1780s primarily by Virginians seeking land following the American Revolution.

Demographics

References

Census-designated places in LaRue County, Kentucky
Census-designated places in Kentucky
Unincorporated communities in Kentucky
Unincorporated communities in LaRue County, Kentucky